Joco Music is Bocephus King's first CD.  The sixteen track CD is a collection of blues/swing/country/rock songs with many New Orleans influences.
The CD was recorded inside Perry's parents' cabin in Point Roberts with help from an army of volunteer musicians and partner Dave Staniforth of Tsawwassen, who also has a CD due out soon: "Without Dave, it couldn't have happened like this."

Personnel
Bocephus King: Vocals, guitar and percussion
Steve Dawson: Guitar, dobro and banjo
Jesse Zubot: Vocals, fiddle, Mandolin and upright bass
Craig Duccomun: Organ, accordion, and syther
Doug Fujisawa: Piano
Darryl Stables: Drums and percussion
Rob Post: Bass
Michael Perry: Bass
Dave Staniforth: Guitar
Panos Grames: Percussion and organ
Alice Dawson: Back up vocals
Theresa Riley: Back up vocals
Steve Hillian: Baritone saxophone
Dan Marcus: Trombone

Track listing

What am I Doing Here?
On the Hallelujah Side
Trouble Me
Where I'm Calling From
If You Want Me I'll Be Drinking
Digging My Grave
Wartime Skies
Safe in Heaven...Dead
Juanita
Lay Down
I'll Die in Mine
Pushing Up Daisies
I Don't Even Want to Get Well
The Haunting of a New York Moon
The Beautiful Thing
Joco Music

References

Bocephus King albums
1996 debut albums